Objezierze may refer to the following places:
Objezierze, Greater Poland Voivodeship (west-central Poland)
Objezierze, Bytów County in Pomeranian Voivodeship (north Poland)
Objezierze, Chojnice County in Pomeranian Voivodeship (north Poland)
Objezierze, West Pomeranian Voivodeship (north-west Poland)